Richard John Garcia (April 24, 1947 – July 11, 2018) was an American prelate of the Roman Catholic Church. He served as the fourth bishop of the Diocese of Monterey in California from 2007 until his death in 2018.  He previously served as an auxiliary bishop of the Diocese of Sacramento in California from 1998 to 2007

Biography

Early life 
Garcia was born in San Francisco on April 24, 1947, to immigrant parents from Mexico. He completed his studies for the priesthood at Saint Joseph College in Mountain View and at St. Patrick's Seminary in Menlo Park, California.

Garcia was ordained to the priesthood on June 15, 1973, for the Archdiocese of San Francisco at Sacred Heart Parish in San Jose, California. For seven years, he served as an associate pastor and coordinator of the Hispanic apostolate.  From 1980 to 1984, he studied theology at the Pontifical University of Saint Thomas Aquinas in Rome.

When the Diocese of San Jose in California was erected in 1981, Garcia was incardinated, or transferred, to the new diocese. He taught at Saint Joseph Minor Seminary in Los Altos, California, and at Saint Patrick Seminary in Menlo Park, California. By 1997, Garcia was serving as the pastor of Saint Leo the Great Parish in San Jose, California and as the diocesan director for vocations,

Auxiliary Bishop of Sacramento 
Pope John Paul II named Garcia titular bishop of Bapara and auxiliary bishop of the Diocese of Sacramento on November 25, 1997 He was consecrated on January 28, 1998, at the Cathedral of the Blessed Sacrament in Sacramento; Bishop William Weigand served as his principal consecrator, with Archbishop John R. Quinn and Bishop Pierre DuMaine as his principal co-consecrators. In Sacramento, Garcia served as vicar general and moderator of the curia, vicar for clergy, episcopal vicar for the Hispanic American population, and vicar for education and vocations.

Bishop of Monterey in California 
On December 19, 2006, Pope Benedict VI named Garcia as bishop of the Diocese of Monterey.  He was installed on January 30, 2007.

In 2009, the United States Conference of Catholic Bishops elected Garcia as a member of the Catholic Relief Services and Catholic Legal Immigration Network, Inc. (CLINIC) where he sat on the board.  Garcia was also a member of Migration and Refugee Services, Subcommittee on Hispanics Affairs  and the Committee on Cultural Diversity in the Church.

In April 2018, Garcia was diagnosed with Alzheimer's disease. García died on July 11, 2018 from complications of the disease at age 71.

See also
 

 Catholic Church hierarchy
 Catholic Church in the United States
 Historical list of the Catholic bishops of the United States
 List of Catholic bishops of the United States
 Lists of patriarchs, archbishops, and bishops

References

External links
Diocese of Monterey official website
Bishop of Monterey 
Bishop Garcia will lead Diocese of Monterey 
United States Conference of Catholic Bishops

Episcopal succession

1947 births
2018 deaths
Roman Catholic Diocese of Monterey in California
Roman Catholic Diocese of Sacramento
People from San Francisco
20th-century Roman Catholic bishops in the United States
21st-century Roman Catholic bishops in the United States
Pontifical University of Saint Thomas Aquinas alumni
American people of Mexican descent
Catholics from California